The following lists events that happened during 1836 in Chile.

Incumbents
President of Chile: José Joaquín Prieto

Events

March
31 March - Chilean presidential election, 1836

July
28 July - Former Supreme Director Ramon Friere attempts to overthrow the government, but fails and is imprisoned.

December
28 December - Chile declares war on the Peruvian-Bolivian Confederation, starting the War of the Confederation.

Births
18 April - Eleuterio Ramírez Molina (d. 1879)

Deaths
date unknown - José Santiago Muñoz (b. 1780)

References 

 
1830s in Chile
Chile
Chile